Narthamalai	 is a village in the Annavasalrevenue block of Pudukkottai district, Tamil Nadu, India.

Demographics 
 census, Narthamalai had a total population of 1950 with 981 males and 969 females. Out of the total population 1188    people were literate.

References

Villages in Pudukkottai district